The canton of Châteaudun is an administrative division of the Eure-et-Loir department, northern France. Its borders were modified at the French canton reorganisation which came into effect in March 2015. Its seat is in Châteaudun.

It consists of the following communes:
 
Alluyes
Bonneval
La Chapelle-du-Noyer
Châteaudun
Conie-Molitard
Dancy
Dangeau
Donnemain-Saint-Mamès
Flacey
Jallans
Logron
Marboué
Moléans
Montboissier
Montharville
Moriers
Saint-Christophe
Saint-Denis-Lanneray
Saint-Maur-sur-le-Loir
Saumeray
Thiville
Trizay-lès-Bonneval
Villampuy
Villemaury
Villiers-Saint-Orien

References

Cantons of Eure-et-Loir